Luciano Marraffini (born July 17, 1974) is an Argentinian-American microbiologist. He is currently professor and head of the laboratory of bacteriology at The Rockefeller University. He is recognized for his work on CRISPR-Cas systems, being one of the first scientists to elucidate how these systems work at the molecular level.

Early life and education 
Marraffini was born and raised in Rosario, Argentina. He had two passions growing up: following his hometown soccer team Club Atlético Newell's Old Boys, and reading about science. Marraffini attended the Escuela Dante Alighieri high school and then entered the Facultad de Ciencias Bioquimicas y Farmaceuticas at the Universidad Nacional de Rosario to pursue a degree in Biotechnology. As an undergraduate he studied the biochemistry of plant ferredoxin-NADP⁺ reductases under the guidance of Dr. Eduardo Ceccarelli. Marraffini moved to Chicago for his doctoral studies. He earned a PhD from the University of Chicago investigating the biochemistry and biological role of sortase, a transpeptidase that links surface proteins to the envelope of Gram-positive bacteria, in the laboratory of Dr. Olaf Schneewind.

Research 
In 2008, Marraffini joined the laboratory of Dr. Erik Sontheimer at Northwestern University as a Jane Coffin Childs Memorial Fund for Medical Research Fellow. In the Sontheimer lab, Marraffini pioneered the study the molecular mechanisms of CRISPR-Cas systems. Using bacterial genetics, he determined that CRISPR-Cas immunity uses sequence-specific DNA destruction to neutralize invaders. This study was key to understand the mechanisms of CRISPR immunity at the molecular level and also predicted the existence of RNA-programmable Cas nucleases and their current applications to gene editing.

In 2010, Marraffini joined the faculty of The Rockefeller University to continue studying CRISPR-Cas immunity. In 2012, he initiated a collaboration with Dr. Feng Zhang of the Broad Institute of MIT and Harvard that culminated in the development of the revolutionary CRISPR-Cas9 technologies to edit the genomes of bacteria and human cells. Currently, research in the Marraffini Lab focuses on the elucidation of the mechanisms of CRISPR-Cas immunity in bacteria.

Awards and honors 

For work in his own laboratory, he was honored with the Searle Scholars award in 2011, the NIH Director's New Innovator Award in 2012, the Hans Sigrist Prize from the University of Bern in 2015, the Earl and Thressa Stadtman Scholar Award from the American Society for Biochemistry and Molecular Biology (jointly with Georgios Skiniotis) in 2016 and the NIH Director’s Pioneer Award and the Albany Medical Center Prize (jointly with Emmanuelle Charpentier, Jennifer Doudna, Francisco Mojica and Feng Zhang) in 2017.

He was elected Fellow of the American Academy of Microbiology in 2017, Member of the National Academy of Sciences in 2019 and Member of the American Academy of Arts and Sciences in 2021. Marraffini was appointed investigator at the Howard Hughes Medical Institute (HHMI) in 2018

References 

1974 births
Living people
American microbiologists
Rockefeller University faculty
University of Chicago alumni
National University of Rosario alumni